The women's 100 metres hurdles event at the 2015 Summer Universiade was held on 9 and 10 July at the Gwangju Universiade Main Stadium.

Medalists

Results

Heats
Qualification: First 2 in each heat (Q) and next 2 fastest (q) qualified for the final.

Wind:Heat 1: -1.3 m/s, Heat 2: -0.8 m/s, Heat 3: -2.8 m/s

Final
Wind: +0.1 m/s

References

100
2015 in women's athletics
2015